Walter Place (1872 – 11 December 1928) was an English professional footballer who played as a winger. His older cousin, also called Walter Place, was also a professional footballer.

References

1872 births
1928 deaths
Footballers from Burnley
English footballers
Association football wingers
Burnley F.C. players
Arsenal F.C. players
Padiham F.C. players
English Football League players
Date of birth missing